Novi Velia is a town and comune of the Province of Salerno, Campania, southern Italy. It is located in the southern Cilento area.

The town takes its name from the ancient Greek town of Velia, whose archaeological remains are located nearby.

Novi Velia is located in the Cilento and Vallo di Diano National Park, and the comune contains Monte Gelbison.

See also
Pruno Cilento — largest forest in the Cilento.
Cilentan Coast

References

External links

Official website

Cities and towns in Campania
Localities of Cilento